Direct connect may refer to:

 Direct Connect (protocol), a file sharing client and protocol
 A protocol used by the program AOL Instant Messenger
 Sprint Direct Connect, a brand name used by Sprint Corporation for its digital push-to-talk service, similar to a walkie-talkie
 Direct Connect is an Australian company related to Lumo Energy